Tesgüino is an artisanal corn beer produced by several Yuto-Aztec people. The Tarahumara people regard the beer as sacred, and it forms a significant part of their society. Anthropologist John Kennedy reports that "the average Tarahumaras spends at least 100 days per year directly concerned with tesgüino and much of this time under its influence or aftereffects."

Etymology
Tesgüino comes from the Nahuatl tescuini which means "heartbeat".

Tradition
The Tarahumara people gather every year during Easter week (semana santa) and drink large amounts of Tesgüino together while following rituals. According to the anthropologist Bill Merrill of the Smithsonian Institution, the sacred drink chases large souls from the persons who drink it, "and so when people get drunk that's why they act like children [...] because the souls that are controlling their actions are the little souls, like little children".

Varieties
The general Tarahumara term for an alcoholic beverage is "Sugíki"; and "batári" is used when the beer is specifically made from corn or lichen flour; "paciki" is used when the beer is made from fresh corn stalks. While tesgüino made from corn is considered the most sacred, the Tarahumara also make beer from agave and wheat, as well as other alcoholic beverages made from fruits such as peaches, berries, crab apples, cactus fruits, and mesquite seeds.

Production
The beer is made from corn kernels which are soaked, sprouted, then ground up, boiled and left to ferment naturally with wild yeast. A local grass is used in place of hops for flavouring. The process begins by malting the corn and spreading it in a shallow basket covered with pine needles each day for four or five days. It is kept moist until the corn sprouts by which time the starch in the corn has been converted into smaller sugars. It is then mashed and boiled for eight hours. Varied herbs are ground up and mixed with water into a paste which is then fermented overnight by a fire. Then the paste is combined with the corn liquid and fermented for another three to four days. The beer-drinking is commenced almost immediately after its preparation, since the beer will usually grow rancid after 24 hours.

See also

Tejuino
Tiswin
 List of maize dishes

References

Notes
 Boza is an Eastern European beer made from wheat.
 Pulque is a Mexican alcoholic beverage made from agave.

Beer in Mexico
Mexican cuisine
Mexican alcoholic drinks
Fermented drinks
Fermented foods
Maize-based drinks